The Goddess of Fortune is a 2019 Italian comedy-drama film directed by Ferzan Özpetek.

Summary
Alessandro and Arturo have been a couple for more than fifteen years. Although passion and love have turned into an important affection, their relationship has been in crisis for some time. The sudden arrival in their lives of two children left in custody for a few days by Alessandro's best friend, however, could give an unexpected turn to their tired routine. The solution will be a crazy gesture. But on the other hand, love is a state of pleasant madness.

Cast

References

External links

2019 films
Films directed by Ferzan Özpetek
2010s Italian-language films
2019 comedy-drama films
Italian comedy-drama films
Warner Bros. films
2010s Italian films